Phil Bradmore (born 2 April 1959) is a former Australian rules footballer who played for Footscray in the Victorian Football League (VFL).

Bradmore was recruited to the VFL from Sydney club North Shore and spent most of his time in the Footscray reserves. A key position player, he played at West Perth for the rest of the 1980s. He won the Breckler Medal, West Perth's 'fairest and best' award, in 1985. Also that year, he represented Western Australian in an interstate match against South Australia at Subiaco. Bradmore also made interstate appearances for New South Wales in the 1988 Adelaide Bicentennial Carnival. In 2015 he played a year of senior football for the Grafton Tigers playing 14 games in the NCFL.

References

Holmesby, Russell and Main, Jim (2007). The Encyclopedia of AFL Footballers. 7th ed. Melbourne: Bas Publishing.

1959 births
Living people
Western Bulldogs players
North Shore Australian Football Club players
West Perth Football Club players
South Warrnambool Football Club players
New South Wales Australian rules football State of Origin players
Australian rules footballers from New South Wales